Tirupati Venkata Kavulu ( Poets Tirupati & Venkata) refers to the Telugu poet duo Divakarla Tirupati Sastry (1872–1919) and Chellapilla Venkata Sastry (1870–1950). These twin poets are acclaimed as the harbingers of modern poetry in Telugu. They have dramatised several of the Hindu epics into dramas and plays consisting of singable verses set to perfect meter. Several of their plays, especially pandavodyogavijayalu have been extremely popular with many drama clubs and audiences across Andhra Pradesh. Venkata Sastry has trained a large number of later age poets including Viswanatha Satyanarayana, Pingali Lakshmikantam and Veturi.

Awards
 Chellapilla Venkata Sastry was conferred Kala Prapoorna by Andhra University in 1938.

Literary works

Original compositions in Sanskrit
1. Dhatu Ratnakara Campu (1889–1893) is a campu cavya with the story of Ramayana illustrating the use of verbal forms for the roots given by Pāṇini, the Sanskrit grammarian.

2. Sringara Sringataka (1891) is a small playlet called Veedhi with predominantly erotic sentiment.

3. Kali Sahasram (1891–1894) is incomplete work (300 slokas) modelled on Lakshmi Sahasram in Sanskrit.

4. Mula Sthaneswara Stuti (1893–1894) was composed in Arya vrittas on Mulasthaneswara, local deity of Nellore.

5. Ashtkas (Kalikadi Stotra), 1889–1890

6. Suka-Rambha Samvadam (1893–1894) is an argumentation between Śuka, the sage and Rambha, the danseuse. Suka interprets Ananda, the Supreme Bliss, in terms of Vedantic Truth and Rambha interprets it in terms of erotic experience.

7. Namassivaya Stotram (1914–1915) is a devotional panegyric on Shiva.

8. Kshampanam (1914–1915)

9. Pishtapeshanam (1914–1915)

10. Salabhalabhanam (1914–1915)

Translations from Sanskrit to Telugu
Devi Bhagavatamu, 1896
Siva Leelalu, 1896
Purana Gadhalu, 1896
Vrata Kathalu, 1896
Srinivasa Vilasamu, 1896–1897
Rasikanandamu, 1893–1894
Suka-Rambha Samvadamu (1893–1894) is translation into Telugu from the poets' own work of the same name in Sanskrit.
Buddha Caritramu, 1899–1900
Vairagya Sataka of Appaya Dikshita, 1899–1900
Bala Ramayana of Rajasekhara, 1901–1912
Mudra Rakshasa of Vishakhadatta, 1901–1912
Mrichchakatika of Shudraka, 1901–1912
Vikramankadeva Caritra of Bilhana, 1901–1912
Candraprabha Caritra of Veera Nandi, 1901–1912
Harsha Caritra of Bana, 1901–1912

Translations from English to Telugu
Stories of Rabindranath Tagore

Original works in Telugu poetry
Sravananandam (1893–1897; 1897–1898)
Panigrihita
Lakshana Parinayamu (1897–1901) was a mythological work which describes the marriage of Krishna and Lakshana.
Ela Mahatmyamu (1898–1900) was a work on the sanctity of River Ela.
Jataka Carya (1899–1930) and Iteevali Carya (1930–1950) are two unique works by Venkata Sastry. It is somewhat autobiographical work based on jyotishaphala. He has recorded his life in verse form. First work described his life from 30th to 60th year and the second work almost to the end of his life.
Divakarastamayamu (1920) is an elegy by Venkata Sastry on the demise of his lifelong partner, Tirupati Sastry.
George V Pattabhisheka Padyalu (1912) were composed on the occasion of the coronation of King George V.
Bobbili Pattabhisheka Kavyamu (1929) was a descriptive poem pertaining to the coronation of the Maharajah of Bobbili.
Kameswari Satakamu (1901)
Arogya Kameswari Stuti (1922)
Arogya Bhaskara Stavamu (1929–1930)
Mrtyunjaya Stavamu
Saubhagya Kameshwari Stavamu (1938–1941)
Sita Stavamu
Siva Bhakti
Go-Devi was work on dialogue between a cow and a tiger.
Pativrata was a kavya based on a folk song wherein a young woman is married to a snake.
Suseela is a work dealing with social customs like divine dispensation.
Poorva Hariscandra Caritramu is a mythological work.
Daiva Tantramu
Satee Smriti was an elegy by Venkata Sastry on the demise of his wife.
Krishna Niryanamu (1918) was an elegy on the demise of the Raja of Polavaram.
Suryanarayana Stuti (1920) was composed by Tirupati Sastry when he was seriously ill before his demise.
Polavaram Rajah gari Sani Mahadasa (1918) is a deprecation of someone who had brought misfortune to the Rajah of Polavaram, his benefactor.
Sukha Jeevi is a panegyric describing the qualities of Edara Venkata Rao Pantulu.

Original works in Telugu drama
Panditarajamu
Edward Pattabhisheka Natakamu
Pandava Jananamu (1901–1917)
Pandava Pravasamu
Pandava Rajasuyamu
Pandava Udyogamu
Pandava Vijayamu
Pandava Aswamedhamu
Anargha Naradamu
Dambha Vamanamu
Sukanya
Prabhavatee-Pradyumnamu (1920–1922)
Gajanana Vijayamu (1901–1912)

Original works in Telugu prose
Bharata Veerulu
Vikrama Cellapillamu
Shastipoorti
Satee Jatakamu

References

Tirupati Venkata Kavulu: Makers of Indian Literature, Salva Krishnamurthy, Sahitya Akademi, New Delhi, 1985.

Indian male poets
Telugu-language writers
Andhra University alumni
20th-century Indian dramatists and playwrights
Indian male dramatists and playwrights
Telugu-language dramatists and playwrights
Telugu people
Telugu poets
19th-century Indian poets
20th-century Indian poets
People from West Godavari district
Poets from Andhra Pradesh
19th-century Indian dramatists and playwrights
19th-century Indian male writers
Dramatists and playwrights from Andhra Pradesh
20th-century Indian male writers
Translators of the Ramayana
Sanskrit–Telugu translators